"Darkside" is a song by British-Norwegian record producer and DJ Alan Walker, featuring Antiguan-German singer-songwriter Au/Ra and Norwegian singer Tomine Harket. The song was released on 27 July 2018 via Mer Musikk and Ultra Music. Two remixes were released, one by Austrian DJ and producer LUM!X and one by Afrojack in collaboration with Chasner. Neither, however, were officially published by Walker's YouTube channel.

Background
The single is the second installment in the World of Walker trilogy, with the futuristic, post-apocalyptic sci-fi world seen in his previous video "All Falls Down" revisited here with hopeful views for the future with majestic landscapes. The video before "All Falls Down", "Tired" served as a prequel to this trilogy where a solar storm destroyed all technology on earth, changing the course of humanity forever. The lyric during the chorus, "I see it, let's feel it, while we're still young and fearless" samples a part from the melody of the popular production music track "Heart of Courage" by Two Steps from Hell.

Music video
These videos were directed by MER creative director Kristian Berg. Together with the accompanying music video "Darkside" is the second song in the "World of Walker" trilogy and follows up the previous single "All Falls Down".

Charts

Weekly charts

Year-end charts

Certifications

References

2018 singles
2018 songs
Alan Walker (music producer) songs
Au/Ra songs
Songs written by Alan Walker (music producer)
Songs written by Andrew Frampton (songwriter)
Songs written by Au/Ra
Songs written by Gunnar Greve
Songs written by Jesper Borgen
Songs written by Mood Melodies
Songs written by William Wiik Larsen